Lucas França may refer to:

 Lucas França (boxer) (born 1968), Brazilian boxer
 Lucas França (footballer) (born 1996), Brazilian footballer